WCLL may refer to:

 WCLL-CD, a TV station in Columbus, Ohio
 West Central Lacrosse League (WCLL), the former name of the West Central Senior Lacrosse League, an amateur box lacrosse league
 Western Collegiate Lacrosse League (WCLL), a conference in the Men's Collegiate Lacrosse Association
 Wisconsin Conservatory of Lifelong Learning (WCLL), a Public Schools district school in Milwaukee, Wisconsin